Hope Mauritania is a coalition of several political movements in Mauritania with the intention of running in the upcoming 2023 parliamentary, regional and local elections.

History
The coalition was formally presented in the Old Youth House of Nouakchott, Mauritania, on 22 December 2022, in a ceremony hosted by the Republican Front for Unity and Democracy (FRUD), the only party legally registered of all forming the coalition.

On 7 February 2023, the coalition decided its main candidates for the 2023 parliamentary, regional and local elections. Elid Ould Mohameden and Coumba Dada Kane will lead the mixed national list, Kadiata Malick Diallo will head the women's list and Khally Mamadou Diallo will lead the youth list.

Ideology
Hope Mauritania opposes the government of Mohamed Ould Ghazouani, stressing that "it is based on discrimination and excessive societal political exclusion", noting that "citizens who have lost hope in the various crisis, have been alienated day after day from their legitimate aspirations for a state of law based on the basic principles of human rights that guarantees equality of opportunity, in the wealth of the country, the access to civil status, the right to acquire education and employment, together with a final rejection of slavery, whether modern or traditional".

In another statement, the coalition said it was "against the marginalization of women, patriarchy, misogyny, the infantilization of youth, mass unemployment, birth inequalities, racism, hunger, the destruction of vital ecosystems, the failure of public health, the arrogance of the elites of ignorance and of the commodity, the reason of arms and the unreason of resignation".

Composition
The coalition includes the Republican Front for Unity and Democracy, the Gathering of Progressive Democrats, the Bloc of Serious Change, the Democratic Popular Movement, Inclusive Mauritania, and the Strong Mauritania Party.

Ex-MP Kadiata Malick Diallo (ex-UFP) and MPs Mohamed Lemine Ould Sidi Maouloud (ex-Choura) and Elid Ould Mohameden (RFD) also joined the coalition, together with activists El Salek Najem and Abderrahman Hamoudi, intellectual Dr. Abou El Abass Ould Brahim and political actor Achraf Ould Hamoud.

See also
 Coordination of Parties of the Majority
 State of Justice Coalition

References

Political party alliances in Mauritania
Political parties established in 2022